Begum Tabassum Hasan (b 1970) is a Samajwadi Party political activist, former Member of Parliament, Lok Sabha from the Kairana Lok Sabha Constituency in Uttar Pradesh, and wife of former MP late Chaudhary Munawwar Hasan. She has been with Bahujan Samaj Party, Ajit Singh's Lok Dal, and Samajwadi Party.

Life 
Begam husband Chaudhary Munawwar Hasan was elected to Lok Sabha in 2004 but died in an accident in 2008. She was first elected to Lok Sabha in 2009 as a Bahujan Samaj Party candidate. She won By-Election from Kairana Lok Sabha seat in 2018 after seat vacated due to death of sitting MP Hukum Singh.

Political career 
She was first elected to Lok Sabha in 2009 as a Bahujan Samaj Party candidate from Kairana. Her son Nahid Hasan lost 2014 Lok Sabha poll from Kairana as a Samajwadi Party candidate. In the 2018 bypoll for Kairana, she won by a margin of nearly 50,000 votes as a Rashtriya Lok Dal candidate supported by a "grand coalition" of Indian National Congress, Samajwadi Party and Bahujan Samaj Party. However, she joined Samajwadi Party and lost the Kairana seat, a year later, to BJP's Pradeep Choudhary, by a margin of over 90,000 votes, in 2019 Lok Sabha Elections.

Positions held

References

|-

External links

1970 births
Living people
Rashtriya Lok Dal politicians
Lok Sabha members from Uttar Pradesh
Women in Uttar Pradesh politics
21st-century Indian women politicians
21st-century Indian politicians
India MPs 2014–2019
Bahujan Samaj Party politicians from Uttar Pradesh
Samajwadi Party politicians